Nasirabad (also Romanized as Naşīrābād) is a village in Forg Rural District, Forg District, Darab County, Fars Province, Iran. At the 2006 census, its population was 836, in 181 families.

References 

Populated places in Darab County